Carolyn Williamson is a South African virologist and microbiologist who is a professor of medical virology at the University of Cape Town. She is a fellow of the Royal Society of South Africa and the African Academy of Sciences, and a member of the Academy of Science of South Africa. Her research focuses on HIV vaccine development and prevention of the disease.

Education and career 
Williamson earned her PhD from the Department of Microbiology at the University of Cape Town in 1988.

References 

Living people
South African scientists
University of Cape Town alumni
Academic staff of the University of Cape Town
Members of the Academy of Science of South Africa
Year of birth missing (living people)
Fellows of the African Academy of Sciences